Echinocyamidae is a family of sand dollars. They are found mostly off the coast of Britain and Ireland and the North Sea, with scattered populations in the tropics.

Description
They are Laganiformes with:
simple radial internal buttresses along interambulacral margins;
periproct close to peristome and opening bounded by first and second paired post-basicoronal interambulacral plates
interambulacral zones terminating adaptively in one or two single small plates
basicoronal circlet small and unspecialized
no food grooves

References

Clypeasteroida